Bösingen is a municipality in the district of Rottweil, in Baden-Württemberg, Germany.

Gallery

Geography

Geographical location
Bösingen is located in Upper Neckar valley between the Black Forest and the Swabian Jura.

Neighboring communities
The municipality is bordered to the south by Villingendorf and the Rottweil exclave Hochwald, on the west by Dunningen, north by Schramberg and Oberndorf am Neckar and on the east by Epfendorf.

Municipality arrangement
The municipality  Bösingen belonged formerly to independent municipality Herrenzimmern. For former municipality Herrenzimmern includes the village Herrenzimmern and the homestead Stittholzhof. In the hamlet  Herrenzimmern the Burgstall Lußburg/Nußburg and lying proofs of the abandoned village Hinterhofen can be found.

History
Municipality Bösingen was newly formed on 1 October 1974 by the association of  Bösingen and Herrenzimmern.

Museums
Farmer museum in Bösingen

Buildings
The ruins Herrenzimmern in the district Herrenzimmern is above the upper Neckar valley.

Regular events
Swabian-Alemannic Fastnacht
Large village festival (annually, alternately in Bösingen and Herrenzimmern)

Economy and Infrastructure
The 81 connects Bösingen to the north with the state capital Stuttgart and to the south with the Lake Constance region and Switzerland. The exit Oberndorf am Neckar is located halfway between Stuttgart and Lake Constance. Both destinations can be reached within one hour. The railway line Stuttgart - Zürich - Milan leads through  nearby Rottweil. There are hourly connections from there to Stuttgart or Singen.

Personality

Joshua Kimmich (born 1995), Football player for FC Bayern Munich and Germany national football team

References

Rottweil (district)